Skogn is a village in Levanger municipality in Trøndelag county, Norway. The European route E06 highway runs through the village, just past the Fiborgtangen industrial area located along the shore. There is a Norske Skog Skogn paper mill at Fiborgtangen. The Nordlandsbanen railway line stops in the village at Skogn Station.

The village of Skogn was the administrative centre of the old municipality of Skogn from 1838 until the municipality was dissolved in 1962.

Notable residents
Marit Breivik, a handball coach
Arne Falstad, a politician (Conservative)
Snorre Gundersen, a politician (Conservative)
Nils Hallan, a historian
Idar Kjølsvik, a theologian
Andreas Lunnan, a journalist
Olav Norberg, a politician (Conservative)
Peter August Poppe, an engineer
Eldar Rønning, a Cross Country skier
Per Sandberg, a politician (Progress)
Egil Sjaastad, a writer
Gustav Sjaastad, a politician (Labour)
Robert Svarva, a politician (Labour)

References

Villages in Trøndelag
Levanger